Fusion Global Business Solutions, formerly Fusion Business Solutions, is a European IT and Customer Service Management company specialising in IT Service Management and Data center infrastructure management. Fusion has customers across EMEA, North America and APAC with its headquarters located in London, UK.

Fusion GBS delivers measured outcomes for customers with AI-powered service management and operations. With their own software and world class vendors like BMC Software and Automation Anywhere, they will help to optimise and automate workflows, improve productivity and reduce costs. With global offices, the company is specialise in complex implementations and working in secure environments.

History
Fusion Global Business Solutions was founded in Feb 1998 as a subsidiary of Horizon Technology Group plc.  In July 2002 the company was subject to a management buyout led by managing director Mark Lyttle and now operates as a private limited company. Fusion Business Solutions (UK) Ltd. is 87.5% owned by Fusion Global Ltd. which is 100% owned by Mark Lyttle.

Timeline
In 2006 Fusion opened an offshore development center in Bulgaria and the company now employs a team of 100 worldwide.

In June 2008 Fusion was presented with an award at the BMC Partner Forum in Lisbon for generating the most BMC licence revenue in the EMEA region.

In December 2010 Fusion acquired Externus, a specialist Green IT business.

In 2016 Fusion was awarded as the Digital Service Management Partner of the Year (Nth EMEA).

In 2017 Fusion rebranded to Fusion Global Business Solutions. The new branding was designed to mirror the increase in global business and significant growth in the North American market.

In 2017 Fusion started a Salesforce practice in the UK to deliver Salesforce applications to large business and enterprise customers.

In 2017 Fusion opened an office in India and Fusion got a certification for Cyber Essentials Plus.

In 2018 Fusion is the award-winning BMC Software Elite Partner. Fusion is one of a select few BMC Elite Partners trusted to deliver solutions globally and one of the only partners in the world primarily focused on BMC Software. The multi-award-winning performance shows the consistent efforts to put customer’s outcomes first. 

In 2018 Fusion acquire BSM Iberia. 

In 2019 VIPCON (Germany) join Fusion. A company of Fusion Global Business Solution (UK) limited under the leadership of John Mohan as CEO. BMC’s two largest and most successful partners come together to create a leading global partner.

In 2020 Fusion partners with Automation Anywhere.

In 2021 Fusion expands its market-leading technology partnerships with LogicMonitor.

Operations
Fusion is a service management and IT operations specialist with partnerships like BMC Software, Automation Anywhere, Logic Monitor and  AWS. With their own products (Fusion Software) like Fusion eBonding, Fusion Al Talos, Visual Boards and Agility Suite for BMC Helix and the technology of their partners, they create the key for successful cooperation. 

The company is headquartered in Greater London, and has offices in New York, Munich, Madrid, Amsterdam and Indore with offshore development center in India.

References

Software companies of the United Kingdom
International information technology consulting firms
Information technology consulting firms of the United Kingdom
1998 establishments in England
Software companies established in 1998
British companies established in 1998